The following is a list of ships that were built by Harland and Wolff, a heavy industrial company which specialises in shipbuilding and offshore construction, and is based in Belfast, Northern Ireland, as well as having had yards at Govan (1914–1963) and Greenock (1920–1928) in Scotland. The 1,600 ships are listed in order of the date of their launch.

1850s

1860s

1870s

1880s

1890s

1900s

1910s

1920s

1930s

1940s

1950s

1960s

1970s

1980s

1990s

2000s

References

Harland and Wolff
Harland and Wolff